The A30 autoroute is a  long toll free highway in north eastern France.  The road is also named the Autoroute de la Vallée de la Fensch.  It forms part of a southern by-pass for the town of Thionville.

Junctions

References

External links

 A30 Motorway on Saratlas

A30